Splint armour (also splinted armour, splint armor, or splinted armor) is armour consisting of strips of metal ("splints") attached to a cloth or leather backing. It is most commonly found as limb armour such as greaves or vambraces.

Description
Limb armour consisting of strips of metal ("splints") are attached to a fabric (cloth or leather) backing ("foundation"). The splints are narrow metal strips arranged longitudinally, pierced for riveting or sewing to the foundation. Splint armour is most commonly found as greaves or vambraces. 

It first appears in a Scythian grave from the 4th century BC
then in the Swedish Migration Era; and again in the 14th century as part of transitional armour, where it was also used to form cuisses and rerebraces.

Splint mail/splinted mail

While a few complete suits of armour have been found made from splints of wood, leather, or bone, the Victorian neologism "splinted mail" usually refers to the limb protections of crusader knights. Depictions typically show it on the limbs of a person wearing mail, scale armour, a coat of plates or other plate harness. 

Knights in effigy are depicted with leg protection of a matrix of disks with a diameter equal to the splints. This style appears to depict sabatons and splints on greaves, or may represent padded armour underneath splints, or the rivets on brigandine.

See also
Coat of plates
Mirror armour
Scale armour
Mail and plate armour
Gambeson
Brigandine

References

Bibliography 
 

Body armor
Medieval armour